Tenji Nozoki (及位典司; born February 16, 1950), best known by the stage name Kazuki Tomokawa (友川 かずき), is a prolific Japanese  musician, active in the Japanese music scene since the early 1970s. His music has been used in the films of cult directors Takashi Miike and Kōji Wakamatsu, and he also appears in person in Miike's Izo (2004).

Japanese poet Satoru Nozoki is his brother.

Discography 
Yatto Ichi Mai Me (English title: Finally First Album), 1975
Nikusei (English title: Human Voice), 1976
Senbazuru Wo Kuchini Kuwaeta Hibi, 1977
Ore no Uchi de Nariyamanai Uta (English title: Poems That Won't Stop Crying From Within Me), 1978
Inu - Tomokawa Kazuki Akita Konsaato Raibu (English title: Dog - Akita Concert Live), 1979
Sakura No Kuni No Chiru Naka O''' (English title: Within the Country of Falling Cherry Blossoms), 1980Umi shizuka, koe wa yami (English title: Sea Is Silent, Voice/Soul Is Suffering), 1981Muzan No Bi (English title: Beauty Without Mercy), 1986Hanabana no kashitsu (English title: Fault of Flowers), 1993Live Manda-La Special, 1994Maboroshi to asobu (English title: Playing with Phantoms), 1994Hitori Bon-Odori (English title: Dance A Bonodori Alone), 1995GO-EN: Live In Nihon Seinenkan, concert with Kan Mikami 1995Shibuya Apia Document, 1995 (Live)Zeiniku No Asa (English title: Fat in The Morning Light), 1996Hoshi no Process (English title: The Process of Stars), 1998 (Compilation)Yume Wa Hibi Genki Ni Shinde Yuku (English title: Dreams Die Blithefully Day By Day), 1998Sora no Sakana (English title: Sky Fish), 1999Akai Polyan (English title: Red Polyanthus), 2000Elise no me (English title: The Eyes of Elise), 2001Kenshin no Ichigeki (English title: A Blow By Kenshin), 2002Box, 2003, a boxset of Tomokawa's previous albums, including 3 bonus CDs of unreleased material (a compilation of his three first albums, Works of Chuya Nakahara and Satoru).Pistol - Shibuya Apia Live 2003 DVD, 2004Itsuka tooku o miteita, 2004 (Compilation with re-recorded and unreleased songs, including "Pistol", from Izo)Golden Best, 2004Satoru, 2005Live 2005 Osaka Banana Hall, 2005Nakahara Chuya Sakuhinnshu (English title: Works of Chuya Nakahara), 2006 (including the same tracks as on Ore no Uchide Nariymanai Uta, but with rearranged music)Blue Water, Red Water, 2008A Bumpkin's Empty Bravado, 2009Blue Ice Pick, 2010Vengeance Bourbon, 2014Gleaming Crayon'', 2016

External links 
Kazuki Tomokawa official homepage (Japanese)
Paintings by Kazuki Tomokawa (Japanese)
Fan-run Kazuki Tomokawa MySpace
 English homepage

Discogs page

Japanese folk singers
Japanese male singer-songwriters
Living people
1950 births
Japanese poets
Musicians from Akita Prefecture
P.S.F. Records artists
20th-century Japanese male singers
20th-century Japanese singers
21st-century Japanese male singers
21st-century Japanese singers